Vishwa Mohan Bhatt, professionally known as V. M. Bhatt (born 27 July 1950), is an Hindustani classical music instrumentalist who plays the Mohan veena (slide guitar).

Personal life
Bhatt lives in Jaipur, Rajasthan, India, with his wife and two sons. His elder son Salil Bhatt is a Mohan veena player (and also a player of the Satvik veena). His younger son Saurabh Bhatt is a Music Composer who has composed music for films, music albums and TV serials. Bhatt's parents, Manmohan Bhatt and Chandrakala Bhatt were teaching and performing musicians, who imparted knowledge of music to V.M Bhatt. His nephew, Krishna Bhatt, plays the sitar and tabla. He is the younger brother of Manju Mehta who is co-founder of Saptak School of Music at Ahmedabad and a trained disciple of Pandit Ravi Shankar.

Career
Bhatt is best known for his Grammy award winning album A Meeting by the River with Ry Cooder released on Water Lily Acoustics label. He is also known for other fusion and pan-cultural collaborations with Western artists such as Taj Mahal, Béla Fleck and Jerry Douglas. Exposure such as an appearance on the 2004 Crossroads Guitar Festival, organized by Eric Clapton, allows his playing to reach a larger audience. Guitar duet release with Guitarist Kapil Srivastava (guitarmonk founder) in the year 2016 for the composition "Merry Love Rain." Folk musician Harry Manx, who studied with Salil Bhatt for five years, plays a Mohan veena. Counting Crows' bassist Matt Malley also plays a Mohan veena and is a student and friend of Bhatt. Australian musician Lawrie Minson also learned Mohan veena from Salil.

In October 2018, 19 year old Sukhnidh Kaur accused Vishwa Mohan Bhatt of "harassing" her when he performed at her school. Kaur was 14 years old at that time and was part of the school choir. Bhatt's son, Salil, has denied these allegations.

Select discography
1992 - Guitar A La Hindustan, Magnasound (India)
1992 - Saradamani, Water Lily Acoustics
1993 - Gathering Rain Clouds, Water Lily Acoustics
1993 - A Meeting by the River (with Ry Cooder), Water Lily Acoustics
1995 - Bourbon & Rosewater (with Jerry Douglas & Edgar Meyer), Water Lily Acoustics
1995 - Mumtaz Mahal (with Taj Mahal & N. Ravikiran), Water Lily Acoustics
1996 - Saltanah (with Simon Shaheen), Water Lily Acoustics
1996 - Tabula Rasā (with Béla Fleck & Jie-Bing Chen), Water Lily Acoustics
1996 - Sounds of Strings, Music today, India
1997 - Iruvar (Original Motion Picture Soundtrack, A. R. Rahman)
2002 - Indian Delta (with Sandeep Das), Sense World Music, U.K.
2008 - Mohan's Veena, Times Music, India
2010 - Desert Slide, Times Music, India
2010 - Mohan's Veena II, Times Music, India
2011 - Groove Caravan, Deeksha Records, Canada
2012- "Morning Mist", Bihaan Music, Kolkatta, India
2014 - OMKARA - The Sound of Divine Love (with Rupam Sarmah)
2015-"Vishwa Ranjini"-Bihaan Music, Kolkatta, India

Awards
 1993 Grammy Award (Best World Music Album) – A Meeting by the River(With Ry Cooder)
 Sangeet Natak Akademi Award, 1998
 Padma Shri, 2002
 Padma Bhushan, 2017

References

Further reading
Hunt, Ken (Oct. 1994) "A straight Bhatt ... the Grammy-winning, Cooder-collaborating inventor of the Mohan Vina" Folk Roots, Oct. 1994; pp. 42–45

External links

1950 births
Grammy Award winners
Hindustani instrumentalists
Indian guitarists
Living people
Rajasthani people
Recipients of the Padma Shri in arts
Musicians from Jaipur
Recipients of the Sangeet Natak Akademi Award
Slide guitarists
Recipients of the Padma Bhushan in arts
20th-century Indian musicians